Ibrahim Mahmut (1862 in Ezerçe, near Razgrad, Özü Eyalet – 1917 in Sarımeşe, near İzmit, İstanbul Vilayet), nicknamed Hergeleci (Turkish for "trainer of unbroken horses"), was a Turkish pehlivan (oil wrestler), who also performed as a professional wrestler. He was the Turkish Kırkpınar champion in 1914.

Championships and accomplishments 
One-time Turkish Kırkpınar Champion, 1914

References 

1862 births
1917 deaths
19th-century people from the Ottoman Empire
People from Razgrad Province
Turkish professional wrestlers
Bulgarian Turks
20th-century people from the Ottoman Empire